A Christmas Carol is a 1910 silent drama film directed by J. Searle Dawley and produced at Edison Studios in The Bronx in New York City. After the 1901 British release Scrooge, or, Marley's Ghost, this American version of Charles Dickens' 1843 novella is the second oldest surviving screen adaptation of the famous literary work. It features Marc McDermott as Ebenezer Scrooge and Charles S. Ogle as Bob Cratchit.

Plot 
The day before Christmas, miserly Ebenezer Scrooge refuses to contribute to the Charity Relief Committee, and then rudely rejects his nephew Fred when he visits Scrooge in his office. When Scrooge returns home, he sees the ghost of his former business partner Jacob Marley, who warns him of the punishment he will suffer in the next life if he does not change his ways. That night, Scrooge is visited by three more spirits, who show him his past, present, and future.

Cast 

 Marc McDermott as Ebenezer Scrooge
 Charles S. Ogle as Bob Cratchit
 William Bechtel, uncredited
 Viola Dana, uncredited 13-year-old child
 Carey Lee, uncredited
 Fred, Scrooge's nephew, uncredited
 Shirley Mason, uncredited 10-year-old child

See also 
 List of Christmas films
 List of ghost films
 List of American films of 1910
 List of A Christmas Carol adaptations

References

External links 

 
 
 
 
 

1910 films
1910 short films
American Christmas films
Films based on A Christmas Carol
American silent short films
American black-and-white films
Films set in the 1840s
Films directed by J. Searle Dawley
Articles containing video clips
1910s ghost films
American ghost films
1910s Christmas films
1910s American films
Silent horror films